The 2022 European Figure Skating Championships were held from 10 to 16 January 2022 in Tallinn, Estonia. Medals were awarded in the disciplines of men's singles, women's singles, pairs, and ice dance. The competition determined the entry quotas for each federation at the 2023 European Championships. Russia swept the titles for a second consecutive European Championships and for the eighth time in history (after 1997, 1998, 1999, 2003, 2005, 2006 and 2020).

Tallinn was announced as the host in June 2019. The city previously hosted the competition in 2010.

Qualification

Age and minimum TES requirements
The competition was open to skaters from all European member nations of the International Skating Union. The corresponding competition for non-European skaters was the 2022 Four Continents Championships.

Skaters were eligible for the 2022 European Championships if they turned 15 years of age before 1 July 2021 and met the minimum technical elements score requirements. The ISU accepted scores if they were obtained at senior-level ISU-recognized international competitions during the ongoing season at least 21 days before the first official practice day of the championships or during the two preceding seasons (adjusted from the traditional one due to the pandemic).

Number of entries per discipline 
Normally, the number of entries would be based on the results of the preceding Europeans. However, as the 2021 European Championships were cancelled, the results of the 2020 European Championships were used instead.

Schedule

Entries 
Member nations began announcing their selections in December 2021. The International Skating Union published a complete list of entries on 21 December 2021.

Changes to preliminary assignments

Medal summary

Medalists
Medals awarded to the skaters who achieve the highest overall placements in each discipline:

Small medals awarded to the skaters who achieve the highest short program or rhythm dance placements in each discipline:

Small medals awarded to the skaters who achieve the highest free skating or free dance placements in each discipline:

Medals by country
Table of medals for overall placement:

Table of small medals for placement in the short/rhythm segment:

Table of small medals for placement in the free segment:

Records 

The following new ISU best scores were set during this competition:

Results

Men 
Sweden's Nikolaj Majorov withdrew prior to the short program due to testing positive for COVID-19.

Women

Pairs

Ice dance 
Poland's Anastasia Polibina / Pavel Golovishnikov withdrew prior to the rhythm dance due to testing positive for COVID-19.

References

External links 
 European Championships at the International Skating Union
 
 Results

European Figure Skating Championships
European Figure Skating Championships
International figure skating competitions hosted by Estonia
European Figure
European Figure Skating Championships
Sports competitions in Tallinn